The Germany men's national under-20 basketball team is a national basketball team of Germany, administered by the German Basketball Federation. It represents the country in international men's under-20 basketball competitions.

FIBA U20 European Championship participations

See also
Germany men's national basketball team
Germany men's national under-19 basketball team
Germany men's national under-17 basketball team
Germany women's national under-20 basketball team

References

External links
Archived records of Germany team participations

Basketball in Germany
Basketball
Men's national under-20 basketball teams